Flavor scalping is a term used in the packaging industry to describe the loss of quality of a packaged item due to either its volatile flavors being absorbed by the packaging or the item absorbing undesirable flavors from its packaging. A classic example is the absorption of various plastic flavors when soft drinks are stored in plastic bottles for an extended period.

See also
Cork tainting

References

Flavors
Packaging